Girl, Boy, Bakla, Tomboy (Girl, Boy, Gay, Tomboy) is a 2013 Filipino comedy parody film produced by Star Cinema and Viva Films starring Vice Ganda in the title role, alongside Maricel Soriano, Joey Marquez, Ruffa Gutierrez, JC de Vera, Ejay Falcon, Kiray Celis, Xyriel Manabat and Cristine Reyes in their supporting roles. It was one of the official entries of the 2013 Metro Manila Film Festival.

The movie was supposedly the first solo movie of John Lapus but Deramas dropped him after he refused to drop weight.

Synopsis
After long years of separation, quadruplets Girlie (Female), Peter (Male), Mark (Gay), and Panying (Lesbian) meet again when Peter needed a compatible liver donor. Mark is the only match, and he sets a condition in exchange of his liver - for Girlie, Peter, and their father Pete (Joey Marquez) experience the hardships he, Panying, and their mother Pia (Maricel Soriano) have gone through. He then makes sure Girlie goes through hell on their behalf. In the process, Mark starts to give their family another chance and sees them on a different light. However, just when things are going well for them, Girlie schemes to get even with Mark. Worse, Pete's current fiancée Marie (Ruffa Gutierrez) plans to have him and Pia permanently separated. Is there a happy ending for this unconventional family?

Cast and characters

Main cast
Vice Ganda as Girlie, Peter, Mark, and Panying Jackstone

Supporting cast
Maricel Soriano as Pia Jackstone
Joey Marquez as Peter "Pete" Jackstone
Ruffa Gutierrez as Marie
Cristine Reyes as Liza
JC de Vera as Osweng
Ejay Falcon as Harry

Xyriel Manabat as Cindy is Pia Jackstone's adopted daughter
Rhed Bustamante as Bella is Pia Jackstone's adopted daughter
JM Ibañez as Ariel is Pia Jackstone's adopted son
Angelu de Leon as Rhea
Bobby Andrews as Jack
Joy Viado† as Lola Amparo Jackstone
Frank Garcia as Dave
Jelson Bay as Janitor
Cecil Paz as Sales Lady
Eagle Riggs
Lassy Marquez
Mc Calaquian
Amelia Kimura 
Atak (actor) as Bar Manager 
Ryan Bang as Jun Pyo
Rubi Rubi as Crazy Patient/Doctor.

Special participation
Karylle as Peter's Girlfriend (cameo role)
Luis Manzano as the priest (cameo role)
 Pia Moran as herself
 Ryan Bang as Jun Pyo
 Johan Santos
Donnalyn Bartolome as Starmobile saleslady (cameo role)

Awards

References 

http://www.rappler.com/entertainment/movies/47249-mmff-girl-boy-bakla-tomboy-review

External links

Official Website

2013 films
Films directed by Wenn V. Deramas
Star Cinema films
Viva Films films
2010s Christmas comedy films
Philippine parody films
Philippine Christmas comedy films
2013 comedy films
Philippine LGBT-related films
Films about siblings
2010s parody films
2013 LGBT-related films
Gay-related films